Cora Alicto (Low)
(born August 2, 1980) is a track and field sprint athlete who competes internationally for Guam.

Alicto represented Guam at the 2008 Summer Olympics in Beijing. She competed at the 100 metres sprint and placed seventh in her heat without advancing to the second round. She ran the distance in a time of 13.31 seconds.

Achievements

References

External links
 
Sports reference biography

1980 births
Living people
Guamanian female sprinters
Guamanian women
Olympic track and field athletes of Guam
Athletes (track and field) at the 2008 Summer Olympics
Olympic female sprinters
21st-century American women